Penicillium armarii is a fungus species of the genus of Penicillium.

See also
List of Penicillium species

References

armarii
Fungi described in 2014